Bathna Krittibas railway station is a halt railway station of the Kolkata Suburban Railway system and operated by Eastern Railway. It is situated at Bathna Krittibas, Ghoralia, Shantipur on the Ranaghat–Shantipur line in Nadia district in the Indian state of West Bengal.

History
The line including Bathna Krittibas railway station was doubled in 2014–15 and electrified in 1963–64.

References 

Sealdah railway division
Railway stations in Nadia district
Kolkata Suburban Railway stations